Senator Harding may refer to:

Members of the United States Senate
Benjamin F. Harding (1823–1899), U.S. Senator from Oregon from 1862 to 1865
Warren G. Harding (1865–1923), U.S. Senator from Ohio from 1915 to 1921

United States state senate members
Alpheus Harding (1818–1903), Massachusetts State Senate
J. Eugene Harding (1877–1959), Ohio State Senate